41 Comae Berenices is a single, orange-hued star in the northern constellation of Coma Berenices. It is visible to the naked eye, having an apparent visual magnitude of 4.80. It is moving closer to the Earth with a heliocentric radial velocity of −17 km/s.

At the age of about 4.5 billion years, this is an evolved giant star with a stellar classification of K5-III, currently on the red giant branch. It has 1.2 times the mass of the Sun and, after consuming the hydrogen at its core, has expanded to 34 times the Sun's radius. The star is radiating 323 times the Sun's luminosity from its enlarged photosphere at an effective temperature of 4,211 K.

In 2017, one planet (HD 113996 b) was found orbiting it via the radial velocity method.

References

K-type giants
Coma Berenices
Durchmusterung objects
Comae Berenices, 41
113996
064022
4954